Bernardo Álvarez Merino (born August 3, 1971 in Reus) was a Spanish basketball player until 2010.

As a player, after playing with CB Tarragona, he played several years at Liga ACB and European competitions with Pamesa Valencia and Plus Pujol Lleida.

Since the 2010-11 season, he became a coach and he starts his career at CB Tarragona in LEB Oro, club which retired his old number 5.

Honours

As player
Pamesa Valencia

Spanish Cup Champion: 1
1998

Plus Pujol Lleida

LEB Catalan League: 1
2007

Spain

Universiade Bronze Medal: 1
1999

As coach
CB Tarragona
LEB Catalan League: 1
2014

External links
Official CB Lleida website
Berni Álvarez profile

1971 births
Living people
CB Tarragona players
Liga ACB players
Small forwards
Spanish basketball coaches
Spanish men's basketball players
Valencia Basket players
People from Reus
Sportspeople from the Province of Tarragona